Amani Oruwariye (born February 9, 1996) is an American football cornerback for the Detroit Lions of the National Football League (NFL). He played college football at Penn State.

Early years
Oruwariye lettered for three years at Gaither High School in Tampa, Florida. As a senior, he was voted team MVP and invited to the Hillsborough County All-Star Game. He was ranked a three star recruit by all four major recruiting services, and 247Sports and Rivals rated him a top 100 prospect in the state of Florida. Oruwariye committed to Vanderbilt University early in his senior year before decommitting and following Head Coach James Franklin to Penn State.

College career 
Oruwariye redshirted his true freshman season at Penn State, then appeared in mostly special teams action during his redshirt freshman year.

In 2016, Oruwariye saw more time en route to Penn State's first Big Ten Championship Game victory. He logged his first interception against Kent State, which he proceeded to return for a touchdown. He finished the season with 23 total tackles.

Oruwariye burst onto the national scene in 2017 due to his personal-best four interceptions, good for fourth in the Big Ten. He earned recognition from both coaches and the media, who elected him second all-B1G. He appeared in all but one game as Penn State clinched its first Fiesta Bowl victory since 1997.

Oruwariye carried his junior year momentum into his redshirt senior year, starting in each of Penn State's 12 games, picking off three passes, and tallying a career highs in tackles, pass defenses, and forced fumbles. His excellence was recognized by coaches, media, AP, and ESPN, all of whom named him to their All-B1G teams. He received an invite to the Reese's Senior Bowl amidst discussions that he could potentially be a first round pick.

Professional career

Oruwariye was drafted by the Detroit Lions in the fifth round (146th overall) of the 2019 NFL Draft. He finished the season with two interceptions and third on the Lions' depth chart.

Oruwariye was placed on the reserve/COVID-19 list by the Lions on July 29, 2020, and was activated 10 days later.
In Week 11 against the Carolina Panthers, Oruwariye recorded his first interception of the season off a pass thrown by P. J. Walker during the 20–0 loss.

Oruwariye entered the 2021 season as a starting cornerback for the Lions. He started the first 14 games before suffering a thumb injury in Week 15. He was placed on injured reserve on December 25, ending his season. He finished the season with 57 tackles, and a team-leading 11 passes defensed and six interceptions. He was third in the NFL in interceptions at the time of his injury.

References

External links
 
 Penn State Nittany Lions bio

Living people
1996 births
American football cornerbacks
Detroit Lions players
Penn State Nittany Lions football players
Players of American football from Tampa, Florida